Roddan is a surname. Notable people with the surname include:

Craig Roddan (born 1993), British footballer
Ron Roddan, British sprinter and athletic coach

References

Surnames of Old English origin